Genovefa von Weber (née  Brenner; 2 January 1764 – 13 March 1798) was a German opera singer and actress. She was born in Oberdorf, Allgäu, Germany and died in Salzburg, Austria. She was the mother of composer Carl Maria von Weber.

Life
Genovefa was baptized into the Roman Catholic faith in Oberdorf (today's Marktoberdorf). At the time she was born, the castle in Oberdorf was the summer residence of Prince-Bishopric of Augsburg, Prince Clemens Wenceslaus of Saxony. She was the fourth child of Marx Brenner, a carpenter working at the Prince Bishop's court, and Maria Victoria Hindelang.

On 20 August 1785, at the age of 21, Genovefa married the 51 year old Franz Anton von Weber (1734-1812) at Schottenkirche, a parish church in Vienna. It was Weber's second marriage. He had two daughters and two sons from his first marriage; and three children with Genovefa. Two of their children died in the childhood.

Franz Anton was in the official service of the Prince-Bishopric of Hildesheim, after which he served as a military officer in the service of the Duchy of Holstein, then, as a music director of a traveling theater group, before became a Kapellmeister at the Princely Court in Eutin, a district capital of Eastern Holstein. Franz Anton was a member of the Freemasons. His brother, Fridolin Weber, who died in 1785, was the father of Mozart's wife, Constanze. Through her marriage to Franz Anton, Genovefa became Constanze Mozart's aunt.

Franz Anton met Genovefa during summer in Vienna of 1783 when he visited his two sons from his first marriage, Fridolin d. J. and Edmund. They were the students of Joseph Haydn. At that time, Genovefa was working as a singer in Vienna. She studied acting and singing under Joseph Lange, and Vincenzo Righini, who was a Kapellmeister in Vienna.

After their marriage, Franz Anton and Genovefa moved to Eutin with the two sons of his first marriage. On 18 or 19 November 1786, Genovefa gave birth to her first son, Carl Maria von Weber. Carl Maria's interest in music was nurtured from a very young age and heavily influenced by his parents’ musical activities. Soon after the birth of Carl Maria in 1787, Genovefa and her husband moved to Hamburg. In 1789, Franz Anton founded a traveling theater company. Their children grew up in the traveling theater environment. Carl Maria was less than five years old when he performed on the stage for the first time. The family gave many performances from Meiningen in 1789, to Nuremberg, Erlangen, Ansbach and Bayreuth from 1791 to 1794, and later to Hildburghausen, Rudolstadt and Weimar in 1794. During this period, Genovefa gave birth to Georg Friedrich Carl in 1789 and Maria Adelheid Antonia in 1797. Georg Friedrich died during infancy while Maria Adelheid died when she was a year old.

While staying in Hildburghausen, Genovefa became severely ill. Due to her illness, her family did not travel frequently for performances. In 1796, Carl Maria continued his piano lessons with Johann Peter Heuschkel (1773-1853) in Hildburghausen.

In 1794, Genovefa appeared regularly as a singer in several parts of Johann Wolfgang von Goethe's theater in various roles in Weimar. On 5 September 1794, Franz Anton sent a letter from Rudolstadtto to Goethe asking him to allow his wife's early dismissal from her contract. Quoted in his letter, "During the employment, there were so many infinitesimal disorder and things which did not allow us to stay longer.". Goethe corresponded to the request in his letter reply dated 23 September 1794.

At the end of 1797, Weber family moved to Salzburg, where Franz Anton had a brief appointment as Kapellmeister and as an impresario, while Carl Maria acquired first basic knowledge of the sentence technique of music counterpoint with Michael Haydn, the younger brother of Joseph Haydn.

Genovefa Weber died of tuberculosis at age 34 on 13 March 1798 in Salzburg. She did not have the opportunity to experience Carl Maria's first published work, a series of six fughetta for piano, which he wrote at the age of 12, the same year she died . Her memorial is located at the cemetery of St. Sebastian, Salzburg in an artificial "family grave" of Mozart, created by Johann Evangelist Engl in 1901.

Genoveva-Brenner-Weg is a street in her birthplace, Marktoberdorf, that was named after her to honor her contributions in music.

References

Further reading 
 Andrea Zinnecker: Von der Kirchensängerin zur Komponistenmutter. Vortrag zum 200. Todestag von Genovefa Brenner. In: Marktoberdorfer Heimatblätter. 1998, pg. 5–13. (German language)
 Ernst Rocholl: Die unruhigen Jahre der Familie von Weber. Lebensstationen von Genovefa von Weber, geb. Brenner, und ihrem Sohn Carl Maria von Weber. In: Marktoberdorfer Heimatblätter. 1998, pg. 35–69. (German language)
 Ernst Rocholl (Zusammenstellung): Carl Maria von Weber und seine Mutter Genovefa von Weber, geb. Brenner. Lebensstationen. (Dokumentation zur Ausstellung aus Anlass des 200. Todesjahres 1998 der Mutter Webers in Marktoberdorf, 1998). Ostallgäuer Buch- u. Offsetdruckerei, Marktoberdorf 1999. (German language)
 Catarina Carsten: „Man sagt, sie habe Stimme“. Das abenteuerliche Leben der Genoveva Brenner – Zum 200. Todestag der Künstlerin am 13. März. In: Salzburger Nachrichten. Salzburg, Saturday, 7. March 1998, pg. IV. (German language)
 Martin Dömling: Genoveva Brenner, die Mutter des Freischütz-Komponisten. In: Marktoberdorfer Geschichtsbuch. Kempten 1992, pg. 216–219. (German language)
 Karl Maria Pisarowitz: Genoveva von Weber-Brenner. In: Götz Frhr. von Pölnitz (Hrsg.): Lebensbilder aus dem Bayerischen Schwaben. Band 6. Hueber, München 1958, pg. 422–445. (German language)
 Friedrich Hefele: Die Vorfahren Karl Maria von Webers: neue Studien zu seinem 100. Todestag. Festschrift Carl M. von Weber (Heimatblätter „Vom Bodensee zum Main“. 30). Müller, Karlsruhe 1926. (German language)
 S. Geiser: Goethe und die Mutter Carl Maria von Webers. Erstveröffentlichung eines Theatervertrags zwischen dem Weimarischen Theater und Genovefa von Weber (1794), nach der Handschrift Goethes. In: Schweizerische Musikzeitung, 97, 1957, pg. 177–180 (German language)
 Bama Lutes Deal: The Origin and Performance History of Carl Maria von Weber's Das Waldmädchen (1800). Chapter 1: Carl Maria von Weber’s musical influences, 1786–1800 (Diss. Florida State Univ., College of Music) 2005, pg. 9–23 (online) (English)
 Christoph Schwandt: Carl Maria von Weber in seiner Zeit: eine Biografie. Schott Music, Mainz 2014,  (Also available as e-book). (German language)

External links 

 Short Biography of Genovefa Weber From Carl-Maria-von-Weber-Gesamtausgabe website (German language)

1764 births
1798 deaths
German opera singers
People from Marktoberdorf